Lothar Schneider (3 October 1939 – 15 March 2019) was a featherweight Greco-Roman wrestler from East Germany. He won a bronze medal at the 1965 World Championships and placed fourth at the 1966 European Championships. He died on 15 March 2019.

References

External links
 

1939 births
2019 deaths
German male sport wrestlers
Wrestlers at the 1964 Summer Olympics
Wrestlers at the 1968 Summer Olympics
Olympic wrestlers of the United Team of Germany
Olympic wrestlers of East Germany
World Wrestling Championships medalists